The Indiana Football Hall of Fame is a sports museum and hall of fame in Richmond, Indiana. It honors persons associated with high school, college and professional American football in Indiana. It also works to establish scholarships and endowments to promote football in the state of Indiana. The hall was founded in 1973 as an affiliate of the Indiana Football Coaches Association.

The museum is housed in a historic post office building at the corner of North 9th and A Streets.

Inductees

 1993: Bill Siderewicz
 2014: Mike Alstott
 Kyle Orton

References

External links
 

Football Hall of Fame
Football Hall of Fame
Football
State sports halls of fame in the United States
American football museums and halls of fame
Football Hall of Fame
Museums in Richmond, Indiana
Awards established in 1973